AD26 or variation, may refer to:

 AD 26, the 26th year after Jesus birth (Anno domini or in the year of the lord). See Gregorian calendar.
 Ad26, adenovirus serotype 26, used for the creation of recombinant virus vectors (rAd26)
 , WWII-era U.S. destroyer tender

See also

 26 Air Defence Regiment (India) (26.AD)
 Ad26.COV2.S, COVID-19 vaccine by Janssen Pharmaceutical (Johnson & Johnson)
 Ad26.ZEBOV, Ebola vaccine
 26 (disambiguation)
 AD (disambiguation)